John Hoyle Cockcroft (born 6 July 1934) is a British Conservative politician.

Cockcroft was educated at Oundle School, and attended St John's College, Cambridge as a senior major scholar, graduating with a degree in History and Economics in 1958. That same year, he was elected President of the Cambridge Union Society. He served as a Lieutenant in the Royal Army from 1953 to 1955.  He worked as a journalist from 1959 to 1974, and again from 1981 through to 1986, writing for the Financial Times, Daily Telegraph, and Sunday Telegraph.  He was Member of Parliament for Nantwich in Cheshire from February 1974 until his retirement in 1979.  He has served on numerous boards and commissions.

References

Conservative Party (UK) MPs for English constituencies
1934 births
Living people
Alumni of St John's College, Cambridge
Presidents of the Cambridge Union
UK MPs 1974
UK MPs 1974–1979